Leslie William George Stevens (15 August 1920 – 1991) was an English professional footballer who played for Tottenham Hotspur, Bradford Park Avenue, Crystal Palace and Tonbridge.

Playing career
Stevens joined Tottenham Hotspur as a junior in January 1940. The winger made 59 appearances and scored five goals in all competitions for the Lilies between 1946–48. He transferred to Bradford Park Avenue in February 1949 and went to notch up four goals in 44 matches. Stevens signed for Crystal Palace in August 1950 and featured in a further 20 fixtures and netting three goals. After leaving Selhurst Park, Stevens had a spell at non-league Tonbridge.

Towards the end of his career, having transferred from Kent League side Deal Town, he played three games as a permit player in 1959-60 for Croydon Amateurs, scoring once before coaching the club's reserve team for the rest of the campaign. These included the Surrey Senior League Cup final against Chertsey Town at Kingstonian on Easter Monday due to injuries.

References

1920 births
1991 deaths
Footballers from Croydon
English footballers
Tottenham Hotspur F.C. players
Bradford (Park Avenue) A.F.C. players
Crystal Palace F.C. players
Tonbridge Angels F.C. players
Deal Town F.C. players
Croydon F.C. players
English Football League players
Association football wingers